Lakya Suryanarayana Tejasvi Surya (born 16 November 1990) is an Indian politician, RSS swayamsevak and lawyer serving as the Member of Parliament in the 17th Lok Sabha from the Bharatiya Janata Party, representing the Bangalore South constituency. He is also the president of the Bharatiya Janata Yuva Morcha since 26 September 2020.

Early and personal life
Lakya Suryanarayana Tejasvi Surya was born on 16 November 1990 into a political family in Bangalore, Karnataka. His father is the former Joint Commissioner of Excise, L. A. Suryanarayana, while his uncle is the three-time MLA from Basavanagudi constituency, L. A. Ravi Subramanya. His mother is named Rama.

At the age of 9, Surya sold his paintings and donated the amount to the Army's Kargil fund while studying at the St. Paul's High School, Belgaum. He was then awarded the National Balashree Honour in 2001 while studying at Sri Kumaran Children's Home, Thyagarajanagar for Creative Scientific Innovation. He later graduated from Bangalore Institute of Legal Studies with a Bachelor of Academic Law and an LLB.

Surya is trained in Carnatic music and he owns an NGO called Arise India, which works in the area of school education. He has previously written for IndiaFacts.

Political career

Early years
Surya was an active member of Akhil Bharatiya Vidyarthi Parishad (ABVP) and was even the General Secretary of Bharatiya Janata Yuva Morcha (BJYM). He had actively contributed to the Bharatiya Janata Party campaign for the 2014 Indian general election and in 2017 he helped organise the BJP's 'Mangalore Chalo' rally. He then led the Digital Communications Team of Karnataka BJP during the 2018 Karnataka Legislative Assembly election. As a lawyer, he had represented many BJP leaders like Mahesh Hegde (editor of Post-Card News), Pratap Simha (MP from Mysore) and had helped lawyer Ashok Haranhalli in defending corruption cases of B.S. Yeddyurappa. He has been mentored by R. Ashoka and V. Somanna, while his uncle, Ravi Subramanya, is a senior leader of the BJP and an MLA representing Basavanagudi.

17th Lok Sabha

The Bangalore South (Lok Sabha constituency) was represented since 1996 by former minister Ananth Kumar until his death in 2018. Tejasvi Surya was chosen to contest for the 2019 Lok Sabha elections from this constituency over Kumar's wife, Tejaswini Ananth Kumar, due to his previous work. While she initially had the support of BJP Karnataka state president B.S. Yeddyurappa, senior BJP and RSS leader B.L. Santosh convinced the party's leadership to choose Surya. He won the elections by defeating B. K. Hariprasad of Congress by  votes, making him the youngest MP to represent the BJP, after having assumed office at the age of 28 years, 6 months, 7 days.

Surya took oath as an MP in Kannada on 17 June 2019. In June 2019, he requested the central government to revert its 2014 decision to remove the requirement of knowing the local language in the recruitment for banks. On 10 July 2019, during the Zero Hour, Surya requested the Home Minister Amit Shah to extend the National Register of Citizens (NRC) to Karnataka, citing the increasing influx of illegal Bangladeshi immigrants in his state. When a holy site was vandalised in Hampi, Surya raised the issue in Parliament, urging the government to ensure better security for the country's sacred monuments. He sought to know whether the Ministry of Health and Family Welfare would ban electronic nicotine delivery systems (ENDS), including e-cigarettes.

In October 2019, Surya expressed his concern over the short term for the city's Mayor. He urged the Chief Minister of Karnataka to draft and pass an exclusive legislation for Bangalore, the Nava Bengaluru Act, to replace the Karnataka Municipalities Act, 1975. On the problem of garbage in Bangalore, Surya responded that he could only bring it to the notice of the authorities and suggested to admonish them. He then claimed he lacked any authority to solve the problem. This response received mixed criticism from the public.

During the COVID-19 pandemic in India, Surya launched a Bangalore South coronavirus task force, which included free home delivery of essential goods, emergency medical assistance, and mobile COVID-19 testing kiosks.

Political Position

Political views
Surya is a staunch advocate of Hindutva. He credits Swami Vivekananda, Aurobindo, BR Ambedkar and Veer Savarkar with inspiring him and shaping his ideology of Hindutva. He attributed the Citizenship Amendment Act protests to be led by 'uneducated, illiterate, and puncture-wallahs'. Surya had previously said "If you are with Narendra Modi, you are with India", and claimed that those who did not support Modi were "strengthening anti-India forces". On another occasion, he had said that the "BJP should unapologetically be a party for Hindus".

Economic views 
Surya is a vocal critic of socialism and has said that "Nehruvian Socialism" deliberately left India poor.

Controversies

Surya's 2015 tweet quoting Tarek Fatah's sexual remarks on Arab women was criticised by Sanjay Jha and the citizens of Arab countries in April 2020.

In 2019, the Indian National Congress, an Indian political party, shared screenshots of tweets posted by a woman who alleged that Surya had abused her. Following this and the announcement of his Lok Sabha candidature, Surya obtained a temporary injunction against 49 media outlets and social media platforms, restraining them from publishing any "defamatory statements" against him. In April 2019, Surya was summoned by the Karnataka State Commission for Women for his alleged abuse of the woman, in addition to a tweet of his that opposed reservations for women (after Mahila Congress lodged complaint against him). The Commission later dropped the case at the request of the woman in question, who wrote that she and Surya were "good friends" and that the complaint against him by the Congress was "politically motivated". 

On 5 May 2021, Surya claimed to have unearthed a scam in BBMP's hospital bed allocation system for COVID-19 patients. He was criticised for reading out the names of only 17 out of the 204 employees in BBMP's COVID war room; all the employees he named were Muslim and Surya was accused of communalising the issue. A total of seven people involved in the scam were arrested by the police by 10 May, with Central Crime Branch officers stating that the accused had allegedly blocked real-time data entry to the Central Hospital Bed Management System hosted by the BBMP and allowed admissions of other patients to the hospital illegally. None of those arrested were the employees named by Surya. Later, he apologized to Muslim BBMP staffers by saying that "If anyone or any community is hurt emotionally by my visit, I apologise for that.”

References

External links
 

Living people
1990 births
India MPs 2019–present
Lok Sabha members from Karnataka
Bharatiya Janata Party politicians from Karnataka
People from Chikkamagaluru
Indian Hindus